Dedieu is a surname. Notable people with the surname include:

Isabelle Dedieu (born 1956), French film editor
Jean Dedieu ( 1645–1727), French sculptor
Jean-Pierre Dedieu (born 1948), French historian
Virginie Dedieu (born 1979), French synchronized swimmer